Agriopodes is a genus of moths of the family Noctuidae. The genus was erected by George Hampson in 1908.

Species
 Agriopodes jucundella Dyar, 1922
 Agriopodes teratophora (Herrich-Schäffer, 1854)

Former species
 Agriopodes fallax (Herrich-Schäffer, 1854)
 Agriopodes geminata (J. B. Smith, 1903)
 Agriopodes tybo (Barnes, 1904)

Agriopodes corticosus, described as Bryophila corticosa by Guenee in 1852 is a nomen dubium.

References

External links

 Note: This is an archived version of the page. As of 2020, Savela gives this name as a synonym of Acronicta Ochsenheimer, 1816.

Acronictinae
Noctuoidea genera